The 1997 Oceania Youth Athletics Championships were held at the National Stadium in Suva, Fiji, between July 11–12, 1997.
A total of 33 events were contested, 17 by boys and 16 by girls.

Medal summary
Complete results can be found as compiled by Bob Snow on the Athletics Papua New Guinea, on the Athletics Weekly, and on the World Junior Athletics History webpages.

Boys under 18 (Youth)

Girls under 18 (Youth)

Medal table (unofficial)

Participation (unofficial)
An unofficial count yields the number of about 170 athletes from 17 countries:

 (6)
 (12)
 (7)
 (37)
 (8)
 (6)
 (6)
 (11)
 (4)
 (8)
 (7)
 (7)
 (19)
 (9)
/ (8)
 (7)
 (8)

References

Oceania Youth Athletics Championships
International athletics competitions hosted by Fiji
Oceanian U18 Championships
1997 in Fijian sport
1997 in youth sport
July 1997 sports events in Oceania